Olorogun O’tega Emerhor (born on 25th November, 1957) in Evwreni, Ughelli is a chartered accountant, Nigerian politician, and businessman.

Education and career
He studied accountancy at the University of Nigeria, Nsukka, from where he graduated with a First Class Honours degree in 1983. 

He was the recipient of many awards during his undergraduate years, including the Faculty Prize for the best final year student and the Lever Brothers’ Prize for Best Graduating Student, among others. 

He was awarded a Federal Government Scholarship in 1980 with which he completed his university education. He qualified as a chartered accountant in 1986 after training with Price Waterhouse Coopers. 

He is an alumnus of the Institute of Management Development, IMD, Lausanne, Switzerland, and also attended a DC Gardner course in London and other courses at the Lagos Business School in Nigeria.

His professional career spans decades in the financial sector and includes working in various capacities at Citibank (then Nigeria International Bank), Fidelity Bank, Guaranty Trust Bank, and Crystal Bank Plc. (later Standard Trust Bank, and now UBA Plc.), which he joined as General Manager and where later rose to MD/CEO. 

Emerhor was renowned as the youngest bank MD/CEO in the Nigerian banking industry in 1995. In 1998, he led investors to acquire Comet Merchant Bank, which later transformed to First Atlantic Bank Plc., where he served as Chairman. Emerhor was later appointed as Vice-Chairman of First Inland Bank Plc. (which was later renamed FinBank Plc.), where he served as a director until February 2009.

Emerhor is a Member of the African Business Leadership Forum, a Fellow of the Institute of Credit and Risk Management of Nigeria, a Fellow of the Academy for Entrepreneurial Studies and Member of the Institute of Marketing Consultants, among others. 

He is a director of Transcorp Plc and chairs the board of Transcorp Hotels plc, owners of Transcorp Hilton, Abuja and Transcorp Metropolitan, Calabar. He also chairs Heroes Furniture Group and Standard Alliance Group where he is Chief Executive Officer. 

Also a director at Suntrust Oil Ltd, he once served as Vice-Chairman of the Nigerian Chamber of Shipping and Chairman of Vitamalt Plc.

Social and political activities
Emerhor is the chairman of the Urhobo Progress Union (UPU) Special Fund Management Board, which is charged with the mandate to raise funds for the development of the Urhobo Nation. His foray into mainstream politics became official when he contested in the PDP's Delta State gubernatorial primaries in 2007. In 2013, he contested in the Delta Central senatorial by-election becoming the first candidate to contest any election in the then newly registered All Progressives Congress, APC.

He is currently the leader of the All Progressives Congress in Delta State, and contested on this platform in the April 2015 gubernatorial election.

Philanthropy
Emerhor is the founder and chairman of the Fair Life Africa Foundation, a non-governmental organization headquartered in Lagos, Nigeria. The NGO focuses on reuniting street children with their families and sponsoring their education, and empowering the less privileged.

He also provides scholarships to students within his locality and makes donations to widows often.

Awards and honors
He is a recipient of the Nigerian national honour, Officer of the Order of the Niger (OON), and a holder of the Dr. Kwame Nkrumah Leadership Award. A Midwest Personality of the Year 2002 awardee, Emerhor is also among others, a United Nations – POLAC Ambassador of Peace (2013), and an Honorary Citizen of the state of Georgia, USA (2015).

See also
 All Progressives Congress

References

Nigerian bankers
Living people
1957 births
20th-century Nigerian businesspeople
21st-century Nigerian businesspeople
21st-century Nigerian politicians
All Progressives Congress politicians